Acheilognathus barbatulus is a species of freshwater ray-finned fish in the genus Acheilognathus. It is endemic to the Mekong river in Laos, northern Vietnam and southern China in waters between 8-20 °C and its maximum length is 8.4 cm.

References

Acheilognathus
Fish described in 1873
Taxa named by Albert Günther